Barisal Engineering College (BEC) is a public undergraduate college in the Barisal District of Bangladesh. It is affiliated with the Faculty of Engineering and Technology of the University of Dhaka. The college enrolls 120 students per year.

History

Barisal Engineering  College was founded on 8 February 2018, with the approval from the University of Dhaka—a faculty exploring new frontiers of Science Engineering and Technology through academic search and development. The main aim of the college is to expand engineering education (sourced from the Ministry of Education, Technical and Madrasa Education Department). The first students were admitted in 2018 for the 2017-18 session. Semester-based meritorious scholarships are awarded to 50% of admitted students. In the effort to revitalize Bangladesh into a middle-income economy, the government has projected to reach 20 percent technical and vocational education by 2020.

Affiliation
Barisal Engineering College is affiliated with University of Dhaka (now the largest public university in Bangladesh), under the Faculty of Engineering and Technology. The Faculty of Engineering and Technology oversees Barisal's academic program.

Campus
The campus covers about 08 acres with 14 buildings—including an administrative building, three faculty buildings, multipurpose building, three halls for students,  two teachers dormitory buildings, two staff dormitory buildings & principal house. There are also power station, a pond and a playground.

Planned improvements include: playgrounds, a library (focusing on engineering texts), modern computer labs with fast internet access, and modern laboratory facilities.

Departments
The college consists of Three departments:

Department of Civil Engineering (CE)

Department of Electrical & Electronic Engineering (EEE)

Department of Naval architecture & Marine Engineering (NAME) (Proposed)

Undergraduate degrees 
 B.Sc in Civil Engineering
 B.Sc in Electrical & Electronic Engineering
 B.Sc in Naval Architecture and Marine  Engineering (Proposed)

Lab facilities

The following equipment and laboratory facilities are available on BEC's campus:

Department of Electrical and Electronic Engineering (EEE)
 Electronics Lab
 Electrical Circuit Lab
 Electrical Machine Lab
 Power System & High Voltage Lab
 Digital Signal Processing Lab
 Structural Machine Lab

Department of Civil Engineering (CE)
 Machine Shop
 Welding Shop
 Surveying Shop
 Foundry Shop
 Transportation Lab
 Drawing Laboratory
 Hydraulics Lab
 Wood Shop
 Environment Lab
 Image Processing Lab
 Geo-Technical Lab

Non-department labs 
 Physics lab
 Chemistry lab
 Computer lab

Residential halls 

The three residential halls include two for male students and one for female students:

Scholarships
1,950 taka are provided by the government to the top 50% students in each department, based upon cumulative grade point average. After graduating, students have opportunities for scholarships to study abroad.

Admission process

BEC's undergraduate admissions are administered by the Dhaka University Technology Unit, which has three associated public engineering colleges:
 Mymensingh Engineering College (MEC)
 Faridpur Engineering College (FEC)
 Barisal Engineering College (BEC)

The DU Technology Unit is also associated with two private institutions, NITER, STEC, HKEC and DEC

Eligibility

Bangladeshi citizens may apply to BEC. Application criteria are as follows:
 Students who passed SSC (Science) or equivalent and HSC (Science) or equivalent with a total GPA of 6.0.

Online applications are available through the Dhaka University Technology Unit Admission Application Online.

DU Technology Unit Admission test mark distribution
 Physics - 35
 Chemistry -35
 Math -35
 English - 15

Honors
Graduates receive the B.Sc Engineering degree, awarded by University of Dhaka.

Club of BEC
 Charulata Cultural Club
 Sports Club
 Photography Club
 IT Club

See also 
 Faridpur Engineering College
 Mymensingh Engineering College
 Sylhet Engineering College

References

External links
 

University of Dhaka
Colleges in Barisal District
Educational institutions established in 2013
2013 establishments in Bangladesh
Engineering universities and colleges in Bangladesh
Barisal